The 1935 Ohio Bobcats football team was an American football team that represented Ohio University as a member of the Buckeye Athletic Association (BAA) during the 1935 college football season. In their 12th season under head coach Don Peden, the Bobcats compiled a perfect 8–0 record (5–0 against conference opponents), won the BAA championship, shut out five of eight opponents, and outscored all opponents by a total of 170 to 36.

Schedule

References

Ohio
Ohio Bobcats football seasons
College football undefeated seasons
Ohio Bobcats football